The Laundry is a tabletop role-playing game published by Cubicle 7 in 2010. The game is based on novelist Charles Stross's The Laundry Files series.

Description
The Laundry is a game where agents have to deal with Lovecraftian outer gods and British bureaucracy at the same time.

Publication history
Cubicle 7 used their Basic Role-Playing license to create The Laundry (2010), based on The Laundry Files series of novels by Charles Stross. The game was published in July 2010.

Cubicle 7 subsequently published a number of supplements:
 Black Bag Jobs, a compilation of scenarios.
 The Agent's Handbook which develops the agents' characters and the internal procedures of the organization.
 The Mythos Dossiers, a compilation of in-game documents to use as play-aids and scenario seeds.
 License To Summon, which give more details on the various forms of sorcery in the game universe.
 God Game Black, which provides more information on the Sleeper's Plateau and how to introduce an eschaton menace in the game.
 Cultists Under The Bed gives more information on the working of various forms of sects and cultists, with several examples of organizations.
 Unconventional Diplomacy, a compilation of scenarios.
 Targets Of Acquisition, which provides dossiers of several occult artefacts.
 As Above, So Below, introduces rules for using special forces in the game and adding a political dimension to games. It also includes two new scenarios. 
A GM screen was announced but was never released. Cubicle 7's licensing agreement with Chaosium expired by mutual agreement at the end of 2017. In 2019 Cubicle 7 stated that the licensing issue would need to be resolved, or a new system introduced, before a revised edition could be published.

Reception

Awards 
 2011 ENnie for Best New Game - Silver Winner

References

External links
 The Laundry RPG at RPGGeek

Basic Role-Playing System
British role-playing games
Cthulhu Mythos role-playing games
Cubicle 7 games
ENnies winners
Espionage role-playing games
Horror role-playing games
Role-playing games based on novels
Role-playing games introduced in 2010